The Journal of Database Management is a top-tier quarterly peer-reviewed academic journal. It was established in 1990 and is published by IGI Global. The editor-in-chief is Professor Keng SIAU (City University of Hong Kong). The scope of the journal is fairly broad and interested researchers can check the journal website for the topics of interest.

Abstracting and indexing
The journal is abstracted and indexed in:

According to the Journal Citation Reports, the journal has an impact factor of 2.656 in 2021. The journal is also an ABDC "A" journal.

References

External links

Publications established in 1990
English-language journals
Quarterly journals
Database Management, Journal of
Computer science journals
Database management systems